The Yagua are an indigenous people of Peru and Colombia.

Yagua may also refer to:

Yagua language, spoken by the Yagua people
Yagua, Venezuela: A town and civic parish of Venezuela

See also
 Peba–Yaguan languages, a language family of the western Amazon